ConDiego was the fifth North American Science Fiction Convention, held in San Diego, California, on August 30-September 3, 1990 at the Omni Hotel San Diego and the San Diego Convention & Performing Arts Center.   This NASFiC was held because The Hague, Netherlands, was selected as the location for the 1990 Worldcon.

Guests of honor
 Samuel R. Delany, pro
 Ben Yalow, fan

Information

Site selection
After "Holland in '90" was selected over the Los Angeles bid as the World Science Fiction Convention to be held in 1990 (as "ConFiction" in The Hague), the WSFS Business Meeting directed that a written ballot election be held at CactusCon, the then-upcoming NASFiC in Phoenix, Arizona, to select a NASFiC site for 1990. San Diego, with 155 of the 184 votes cast, became the first NASFiC site to be selected at another NASFiC.

Committee
 Chair: Albert Lafreniere II

Events

Notable program participants

See also
 World Science Fiction Society

References

External links
 NASFiC Official Site

North American Science Fiction Convention
Festivals in San Diego
1990 in the United States
1990 in California